3 is the third studio album by French new wave band Indochine. It was released in 1985 in France, Germany, Canada, Japan and Sweden.

"3eme Sexe" was the inspiration for Mylène Farmer's song "Sans contrefaçon". Miss Kittin covered "3ème Sexe" for her album I Com and was reworked by Christine and the Queens as "3SEX" with Indochine in 2020.

Track listing

References

External links
 Detailed album information at www.indo-chine.org

1985 albums
Indochine (band) albums
Albums produced by Philippe Eidel